The 33d Combat Communications Squadron (33 CCS) was a United States Air Force combat communications squadron, located at Tinker AFB. They deployed quality communications-computer systems and air traffic services for military operations and emergency missions under hostile and base conditions anytime, anywhere. The 33d CCS was inactivated as part of the overall inactivation of the 3 CCG (Combat Communications Group) in May 2012. In January 2013 the 33d was unofficially merged with the 31st CCS as part of the inactivation proceedings. The unit is expecting to be completely inactivated no later than October 2013.

Mission
Provide engineering team and expeditionary communications to support advance, the initial reception of forces, and "reach forward" key personnel deployment. Provide communications infrastructure to activate and robust two air expeditionary wings (AEW) with maximum boots on the ground of 3,000 persons each. Provide deployed base information infrastructure across the full spectrum of operations. Provide connectivity for base infrastructure and from base infrastructure to theatre information infrastructure. Provide power and environmental control where these services are not available from host or wing civil engineering. Provide theatre-level services, including global broadcast system tactical receive suite, line of sight, and intra-theatre information infrastructure. Provide air traffic control services to one AEW.

History
The 33d has been a part of the 3d Combat Communications Group since its re-inception as a unit in 1988. The 33d has deployed in support of missions throughout both conflicts in the Mid East, including direct support of operations Iraqi Freedom and New Dawn. The 33d has provided reliable deployable communications and tactical airfield and air traffic control support for more than two decades.

In May 2012, the 33d and all of its sister squadrons and command group slated for inactivation in the fiscal year 2013.

Assignments

Major Command
Tactical Air Command/Air Combat Command (1990–2009)
Air Force Space Command (2009–2013)

Wing/Group
 3d Combat Communications Group (1988–2013)

Previous designations
 None

Bases stationed
Tinker AFB, Oklahoma (1988–2013)

Commanders
 Maj Roy "Chip" Brown	   July (1988–1989)
 Capt John Haven	   (1989–1992)
 Lt Col James Cresta (1992–1994)
 Lt Col Frank K. Brooks
 Lt Col Kurt Klausner
 Lt Col Beau Buder	   (1997–1998)
 Lt Col Edward Keegan 	   July (1998–2000)
 Lt Col Mark Langenderfer
 Lt Col Amy Dayton
 Lt Col Paula Gregory 	   July (2004–2006)
 Maj. Terrence Adams	   (2006–2008)
 Maj. Jennifer Hlavaty	   July (2008– )
 Lt. Col Yashua Gustafson (2010–2012)
 Capt. Matthew W. Meckes (2012–2013)

Decorations
 Campaign Streamers. Southwest Asia: Defense of Saudi Arabia; Liberation and Defense of Kuwait.
 Air Force Outstanding Unit Awards: 1 May 1990 – 30 Apr 1992; 1 Apr 1992 – 31 Mar 1994; 1 Apr – 31 Dec 1994; 1 Jan 1995 – 31 May 1996; 1 Jun 1996 – 31 May 1997; 1 Jun 1999 – 31 May 2001; 1 Jun 2001 – 31 May 2002.
 Meritorious Unit Award: 1 Jun 2008 – 31 May 2009.

See also
3d Combat Communications Group
31st Combat Communications Squadron
32nd Combat Communications Squadron
34th Combat Communications Squadron

References

External links
Tinker AFB, Oklahoma

Combat Communications 0033
Military units and formations in Oklahoma